This is a list of marae (Māori meeting grounds) in Canterbury, New Zealand.

In October 2020, the Government committed $160,440 through the Provincial Growth Fund to upgrade two marae in the region, with the intention of creating 30 jobs.

Kaikoura District

Waimakariri District

Christchurch City

Selwyn District

Ashburton District

Timaru District

Waimate District

See also
 Lists of marae in New Zealand
 List of marae in the Chatham Islands
 List of schools in Canterbury, New Zealand

References

Canterbury, New Zealand, List of marae in
Marae
Marae in Canterbury, New Zealand, List of